The Hockanum River is a river in Connecticut.  Hockanum is derived from the Native American Podunk people Algonquin language word meaning "hook-shaped", so named because of the course of the river. The Hockanum neighborhood in East Hartford is named after it.

It rises at the outlet of Shenipsit Lake in Rockville, then flows through Vernon, Ellington, Manchester, and East Hartford. Its mouth on the Connecticut River is immediately north of the Charter Oak Bridge and south of and across from the mouth of the Park River.

The Hockanum River runs for about  until it spills into the Connecticut River. It begins at the bridge at Pleasant View Drive, one mile west of Vernon Center, and continues to the Connecticut River. This river run is mostly quickwater with one Class II whitewater area that eventually fades to flatwater and tidal water at its mouth at the Connecticut River.

Historically used for industry, the river has in recent years had hiking trails and linear parks developed along its banks. The banks of the river are slowly being cleaned up after years of pollution and dumping.

See also
List of rivers of Connecticut

References

External links
 Connecticut Explorer's Guide  Online paddling map of the Hockanum River

East Hartford, Connecticut
Vernon, Connecticut
Connecticut placenames of Native American origin
Rivers of Hartford County, Connecticut
Tributaries of the Connecticut River
Rivers of Connecticut